United Nations Security Council Resolution 378, adopted on October 23, 1975, considered a report by the Secretary General and noted the developments in the situation in the Middle East. The Secretary General viewed any relaxation in the search for peace at that time to be especially dangerous and urged for a resolution to the situation, namely through the adaption of the plan laid out in resolution 338.

With that in mind, the Council called for all the parties concerned to immediately implement resolution 338, they renewed the mandate of the United Nations Emergency Force for another year until October 24, 1976, and requested the Secretary-General submit another report on the situation at the end of that year.  The Council also expressed its confidence that the force would be maintained with "maximum efficiency and economy".

The resolution was adopted by 13 votes; China and Iraq did not participate in the vote.

See also
 Arab–Israeli conflict
 Egypt–Israel relations
 List of United Nations Security Council Resolutions 301 to 400 (1971–1976)
 Yom Kippur War

References
Text of the Resolution at undocs.org

External links
 

 0378
Arab–Israeli peace process
 0378
Yom Kippur War
October 1975 events